

Šventoji Lighthouse is a lighthouse located in the town of Šventoji (Lithuania's northernmost town on the Baltic coast) in Lithuania, on the coast of the Baltic Sea. The lighthouse is located 8 kilometres south from the Latvian border.

Constructed in 1957, the original lighthouse was a wooden square structure made of large wooden beams, this was replaced with metal in the year 2000. The lighthouse has white and red slatted daymarks on the upper half of its structure. The light characteristic is three long flashes of white light every fifteen seconds.

See also

 List of lighthouses in Lithuania

References

Lighthouses completed in 1957
Resort architecture in Lithuania
Lighthouses in Lithuania
Šventoji, Lithuania